Lake Belaunde, is a natural reservoir of fresh water located in the district of Chacas, Ancash, in the area of the Cordillera Blanca at 4500 meters. It originated from the deglaciation of glacier Yanarahu in 1968. It was renamed in honor of former President Fernando Belaunde Terry who supported the construction of the AN-107 Route, which runs along its banks south and east.

It is the smallest of the group of three lagoons that are located in the basin of river Putaqa. It's one of the most accessible areas of the province.

References

Bibliography

See also
 List of lakes of Peru

Belaunde
Belaunde
Huascarán National Park